Chester Bidwell Darrall (June 24, 1842January 1, 1908) was an American Republican Congressman from Louisiana during the latter half of the 19th Century.

Early life and military service
He was born near Addison, Somerset County, Pennsylvania, and attended the common schools. Darrall studied medicine and was graduated from Albany Medical College in New York State. During the Civil War, Dr. Darrall entered the Union Army as assistant surgeon of the Eighty-sixth Regiment, New York Volunteers, and later was promoted to surgeon. While on active duty in Louisiana, Darrall resigned from the Army in 1867 and engaged in mercantile pursuits and planting in Brashear (now Morgan City), Louisiana.

Political career and later life

Darrall was elected a member of the State Senate of Louisiana in 1868. In 1868 Darrall was elected as a Republican Party to the Forty-first Congress and to the three succeeding Congresses (March 4, 1869 – March 4, 1877). He presented credentials as a member-elect to the Forty-fifth Congress and served in that Congress from March 4, 1877 to February 20, 1878 when he was succeeded by Democrat Joseph H. Acklen, who had successfully contested the election of 1876. Darrall moved back to Morgan City and did not seek nomination the next year. In 1880, he was elected for the final time to Congress, serving from March 4, 1881 to March 4, 1883 (the 47th Congress). He was an unsuccessful candidate for reelection in 1882 to the Forty-eighth Congress, being defeated by fellow Republican William Pitt Kellogg. After his service in Congress, Darrall was appointed by President Chester A. Arthur to be Registrar of the United States Land Office in New Orleans from 1883 to 1885. He ran one final time, unsuccessfully, for Congress in 1888. After that, Darrall moved to Washington, D.C., where he wrote a series of books about combat medicine and surgery. He is interred in Glenwood Cemetery in the District of Columbia.

References

 Retrieved on 2009-03-18

External links

1842 births
1908 deaths
Republican Party Louisiana state senators
People from Somerset County, Pennsylvania
Union Army surgeons
Albany Medical College alumni
People of Pennsylvania in the American Civil War
People of Louisiana in the American Civil War
American surgeons
People from Morgan City, Louisiana
Burials at Glenwood Cemetery (Washington, D.C.)
Republican Party members of the United States House of Representatives from Louisiana
19th-century American politicians